The Truman Show: Music from the Motion Picture is a soundtrack to the 1998 film of the same name and was composed by Burkhard Dallwitz. Dallwitz was hired after Peter Weir received a tape of his work while in Australia for the post-production. Some parts of the soundtrack were composed by Philip Glass, including four pieces which appeared in his previous works (Powaqqatsi, Anima Mundi and Mishima, the opening movement from the latter of which appears over the end credits in The Truman Show). Glass also appears very briefly in the film as one of the in-studio composer / performers. Glass and Dallwitz won a Golden Globe for Best Original Score.

Also featured are Frédéric Chopin's second movement (Romanze-Larghetto) from his first piano concerto, performed by the New Symphony Orchestra of London under the direction of Stanisław Skrowaczewski with pianist Arthur Rubinstein, Wolfgang Amadeus Mozart's Rondo alla turca from his Piano Sonata No. 11 in A Major, performed by Wilhelm Kempff; Wojciech Kilar's Father Kolbe's Preaching performed by the Warsaw National Philharmonic Orchestra; as well as the song 20th Century Boy performed by rockabilly band The Big Six.

Although not part of the soundtrack, Wolfgang Amadeus Mozart's Horn Concerto No. 1 and "Love Is Just Around The Corner" by Jackie Davis were also featured in the film.

Track listing

References

External links
 Soundtracks for The Truman Show at Internet Movie Database

1998 soundtrack albums
Milan Records soundtracks
Burkhard Dallwitz albums
Science fiction film soundtracks
Comedy film soundtracks
Drama film soundtracks